Roland Schmaltz (born 15 November 1974) is a German chess grandmaster. His peak Elo rating was 2559. He has the nickname "Hawkeye" and is a champion in bullet chess.

External links

 
 

1974 births
Living people
German chess players
Chess grandmasters
Sportspeople from Mannheim